Hassalstrongylus forresteri is a nematode worm of the genus Hassalstrongylus that infects the marsh rice rat (Oryzomys palustris) in the United States. It was first described as Hassalstrongylus musculi by Marie-Claude Durette-Desset in 1972, but she later recognized it as a different species, H. forresteri. The females cannot be distinguished from those of the other species in the marsh rice rat, H. musculi and H. lichtenfelsi.

See also 
 List of parasites of the marsh rice rat

References

Literature cited 
Diaw, O.T. 1976. Contribution a l'etude de nematodes Trichostrongyloidea parasites de xenarthre, marsupiaux et rongeurs neotropicaux. Bulletin de la Muséum National de la Histoire Naturel de Paris (Zoologie) 282:1065–1089.
Kinsella, J.M. 1988. Comparison of helminths of rice rats, Oryzomys palustris, from freshwater and saltwater marshes in Florida. Proceedings of the Helminthological Society of Washington 55(2):275–280.

Heligmonellidae
Parasites of rodents
Parasitic nematodes of mammals